Valley Bend, West Virginia may refer to:
Valley Bend, Barbour County, West Virginia, an unincorporated community in Barbour County
Valley Bend, Randolph County, West Virginia, a census-designated place in Randolph County